Mirror Man is the name of three different characters appearing in comic books published by DC Comics.

Fictional character biography

Floyd Ventris

Floyd Ventris is a criminal who was detained at Gotham State Penitentiary. Using broken mirror shards, he distracts the guards long enough to escape from prison. Inspired by the mirrors, he becomes Mirror Man. Upon creating a machine that would enable him to see through objects, Mirror Man began targeting Batman so that he can find out his secret identity. He was able to see under Batman's cowl and discover his identity of Bruce Wayne. Batman writes a letter to the Gotham Gazette about the times they thought he was falsely exposed as Bruce Wayne. This causes Mirror Man to try to get a similar image of Batman which fails as Mirror Man is defeated. When Mirror Man is incarcerated at Gotham State Penitentiary, Batman revealed that he used a special cowl made of mirrors which was the reason why Mirror Man failed to get another image of Batman's identity.

Mirror Man later escapes from prison and begins another plan to expose Bruce Wayne as the true identity of Batman. Bruce Wayne outwits Mirror Man's thugs at the Gotham Museum which is witnessed by Vicki Vale. Despite Batwoman's efforts to stop them, Mirror Man and his thugs escape. By Mirror Man's next attack, Vicki Vale hires an actor to pose as Bruce Wayne in order to keep Batman's identity a secret even though she was unaware that Bruce had asked Alfred Pennyworth to impersonate Batman. When one of Mirror Man's thugs finds out about Vicki's hoax, Mirror Man and his thugs are defeated by Batman and taken to GCPD Headquarters. Wayne appears at the police department causing Mirror Man's theory to be dropped.

Following the "Crisis on Infinite Earths" storyline, Mirror Man is among the villains that were sprung from Gotham State Penitentiary by Ra's al Ghul. However, Ventris was one of the freed villains who chose not to take part in the mass attack on Batman staged by Ra's and instead went into hiding, and has not been seen since.

Mirror Man II
In the three-part miniseries Arkham Reborn, a different Mirror Man appeared. This person has an obsession with mirrors and has also used the alias of "Narcissus". Nothing else was known about him other than the fact that he was first seen walking out of a forest in Haiti, the intelligible words that he spoke were repeated by him like an echo, and he had a human appearance. Mirror Man is one of the Arkham Asylum inmates alongside No-Face and the Hamburger Lady that are labeled as Jeremiah Arkham's "special subjects" that nobody knows about.

Mirror Man III
The third Mirror Man appears during the "Gotham Underground" storyline. He is an unnamed African-American man who is a part of the New Rogues which were assembled by the Penguin. As this group is modeled after the Rogues, Mirror Man is modeled after the Mirror Master.

During the Final Crisis storyline, Mirror Man and the New Rogues are enlisted by Libra to get the Rogues back into the Secret Society of Super Villains. He fought the Mirror Master, who was able to use his mirrors to blind Mirror Man and then strangle him with one of the Trickster's springs.

Powers and abilities
The Floyd Ventris version of Mirror Man has genius-level intellect and uses devices that are themed with mirrors.

The New Rogues version of Mirror Man uses Mirror Master's special mirrors in battle.

In other media
 A version of Mirror Man, under the similar name Lloyd Ventrix appears in the Batman: The Animated Series appeared in "See No Evil", voiced by Michael Gross. Lloyd Ventrix was an ex-con/lab assistant who became divorced from Helen Ventrix, who had the custody of their daughter, Kimberly. Using a suit that allowed him to turn invisible that he acquired from a place he worked at on parole, Lloyd sneaked into Kimberly's bedroom and posed as her imaginary friend "Mojo". During one of these meetings, Lloyd learned that Helen and Kim were going to be moving away from Gotham soon and he did not like the idea. Using the invisibility suit, he started a crime spree to acquire more of the wealth he was giving to Kimberly as Mojo and convince Helen to stay in Gotham, but his actions only attracted the attention of Batman, who deduced Ventrix's identity after a quick research. However, by the time he warned Helen about her ex-husband's scheme, Lloyd, now driven chemically insane by the suit, had taken Kim away. Batman followed Lloyd and stopped him from kidnapping the little girl. Lloyd tried to escape using his invisible technology and after a long chase, he was forced to fight the Dark Knight. For the most part, Lloyd got the upper hand of the fight, mostly because of his invisibility, but once Batman figured a way to spot him, Lloyd was knocked unconscious in a few seconds.
 The Pre-Crisis Mirror Man appears in the Batman: The Brave and the Bold episode "A Bat Divided!". He is seen at the 8 Bar, where the villains hang out, when Firestorm and the three Batmen arrive.

References

External links
 Mirror Man (Floyd Ventris) at DC Comics Wiki
 Mirror Man (New Rogues version) at DC Comics Wiki

Characters created by Bill Finger
Characters created by Sheldon Moldoff
Comics characters introduced in 1954
DC Comics male supervillains
Fictional professional thieves
Fictional gangsters
Fictional criminals